Leena Mohanty is a leading exponent of Odissi dance, a disciple of Guru Deba Prasa Das. She is a recipient of the first Ustad Bismillah Khan Youth award, along with recoeving the Mahari award, the Sanjukta Panigrahi award and is an empanelled artist of the ICCR. She is a choreographer and has performed internationally. She is the artistic director of Bansi Bilas, Bhubaneshwar, Odisha and heads the Odissi Department of Kalpana Dance Theatre in Kuala Lumpur, Malaysia, as well as the Trinayan Dance Centre in New York.

Early life 
Leena Mohanty was born and brought up in Bhubaneswar, Odisha, India to Rabinarayana Mohanty (Gurudas), a businessman and Swarna Mohanty, a poet. Introduced to Odissi dance at the tender age of four, she first learnt under Deba Prasad Das, one of the four first generation gurus of Odissi, but after the demise of her teacher she continued her training under Guru Durga Charan Ranbir. She still continues to perform and teach Odissi dance.

In 1984, she played the role of  Lalita, Srimati Radha's faithful friend, in the Odiya movie " Basanta Rasa" directed by Gurudas.

Awards 
 Recipient of Ustad Bismillah Khan Yuva Puraskar 2006 from Sangeet Natak Akademi, New Delhi
 Recipient of the Mahari Award, 2006
 Recipient of Sanjukta Panigrahi Award, Patitapawan Kala Niketan, New Delhi
 Recipient of Junior Fellowship in dance from Ministry of Human Resource Development, government of India
 Recipient of Senior National Scholarship in Odissi dance from Department of Culture, govt. Of India
 Awarded the title Singarmani by Sursingar Samsad, Mumbai, India
 Empanelled artist of the Indian council of Cultural Relations (ICCR)

References 
http://www.artindia.net/leena

http://artindia.net/leena/about.html

http://pad.ma/BCW/info

http://www.thestar.com.my/lifestyle/entertainment/arts/2013/07/23/two-dance-forms-come-together-in-sharanagati/

https://www.nytimes.com/2010/08/21/arts/dance/21fringe.html

https://orissamatters.wordpress.com/tag/leena-mohanty/

https://www.deccanchronicle.com/lifestyle/books-and-art/280718/ode-to-the-odissi.html

https://www.thehindu.com/entertainment/dance/leena-mohantys-upcoming-odissi-performance-in-bengaluru-anurati-is-based-on-the-different-kinds-of-love/article66086210.ece

https://www.deccanchronicle.com/lifestyle/books-and-art/040818/mudras-of-movement.html

https://www.thehindu.com/entertainment/dance/revealing-a-different-story/article21289124.ece

https://www.theedgemarkets.com/article/odissi-extravaganza-0

https://www.pressreader.com/malaysia/the-star-malaysia-star2/20170708/281749859386213

Odissi exponents
Indian female classical dancers
Performers of Indian classical dance
Living people
Year of birth missing (living people)